A defensive war is one of the causes that justify war by the criteria of the Just War tradition. It means a war where at least one nation is mainly trying to defend itself from another, as opposed to a war where both sides are trying to invade and conquer each other.

History
American supporters of war against the British argued that the War of 1812 was a defensive war.

Views
The Islamic scholar Sufyan al-Thawri (716–778), who was called by Majid Khadduri (1909–2007) a pacifist, maintained that jihad (holy war) was only a defensive war.

See also
 Battleplan (documentary TV series)

References

Sources

Wars by type
Warfare by type